Marcello Truzzi (September 6, 1935 – February 2, 2003) was a professor of sociology at New College of Florida and later at Eastern Michigan University, founding co-chairman of the Committee for the Scientific Investigation of Claims of the Paranormal (CSICOP), a founder of the Society for Scientific Exploration, and director for the Center for Scientific Anomalies Research.

Truzzi was an investigator of various protosciences and pseudosciences and, as fellow CSICOP cofounder Paul Kurtz dubbed him "the skeptic's skeptic". He is credited with originating the oft-used phrase "Extraordinary claims require extraordinary proof", though earlier versions existed.

Early life and education
Truzzi was born in Copenhagen, Denmark, and was the only child of juggler Massimiliano Truzzi and his wife Sonya. His family moved to the United States in 1940 where his father performed with the Ringling Bros. and Barnum & Bailey Circus.

Truzzi earned several degrees in sociology: his Bachelor of Arts from Florida State University in 1957, his Master of Arts from the University of Florida in 1962, and his doctorate from Cornell University in 1970. He served in the United States Army between 1958 and 1960; he became a naturalized citizen in 1961.

Career 
A professor of sociology at Eastern Michigan University from 1974–2003, Truzzi served as the chair of the sociology department from 1974 to 1985.

Truzzi also taught at Cornell, the University of South Florida, the University of Michigan, and the New College of Florida. His 1968 textbook, “Sociology in Every Day Life,” was a best-seller.

Truzzi founded the skeptical journal Explorations. In 1976, Truzzi was a founding member of the skeptic organization CSICOP and served as its co-chairman along with Paul Kurtz. Truzzi's journal became the official journal of the Committee for the Scientific Investigation of Claims of the Paranormal (CSICOP) and was renamed The Zetetic ("zetetic" is another name for "skeptic" and is not to be confused with zetetics, the study of the relationship of art and science). The journal was under his editorship for the first year, until August 1977. He left CSICOP about a year after its founding, after receiving a vote of no confidence from the group's Executive Council. Truzzi wanted to include pro-paranormal people in the organization and pro-paranormal research in the journal, but CSICOP felt that there were already enough organizations and journals dedicated to the paranormal.  Kendrick Frazier became the editor of CSICOP's journal and the name was changed to Skeptical Inquirer.

After leaving CSICOP, Truzzi started another journal, the Zetetic Scholar. He promoted the term "zeteticism" as an alternative to "skepticism", because he thought that the latter term was being usurped by what he termed "pseudoskeptics". A zetetic is a "skeptical seeker". The term's origins lie in the word for the followers of the skeptic Pyrrho in ancient Greece. Skeptic's Dictionary memorialized Truzzi thus:Truzzi considered most skeptics to be pseudoskeptics, a term he coined to describe those who assume an occult or paranormal claim is false without bothering to investigate it. A kind way to state these differences might be to say that Marcello belonged to the Pyrrhonian tradition, most of the rest of us belong to the Academic skeptical tradition.Truzzi was skeptical of investigators and debunkers who determined the validity of a claim prior to investigation. He accused CSICOP of increasingly unscientific behavior, for which he coined the term pseudoskepticism. Truzzi stated:

Truzzi held that CSICOP researchers sometimes also put unreasonable limits on the standards for proof regarding the study of anomalies and the paranormal. Martin Gardner wrote: "In recent years he (Truzzi) has become a personal friend of Uri Geller; not that he believes Uri has psychic powers, as I understand it, but he admires Uri for having made a fortune by pretending he is not a magician."

Truzzi co-authored a book on psychic detectives entitled The Blue Sense: Psychic Detectives and Crime. It investigated many psychic detectives and concluded: "[W]e unearthed new evidence supporting both sides in the controversy. We hope to have shown that much of the debate has been extremely simplistic." The book also stated that the evidence didn't meet the burden of proof demanded for such an extraordinary claim.

Although he was familiar with folie à deux, Truzzi was confident a shared visual hallucination could not be skeptically examined by one of the participators. Thus he categorized it as an anomaly. In a 1982 interview Truzzi stated that controlled ESP (ganzfeld) experiments had "gotten the right results" maybe 60 percent of the time. This question remains controversial. Truzzi remained an advisor to IRVA, the International Remote Viewing Association, from its founding meeting until his death.

Truzzi was Keynote Speaker at the 1st annual National Roller Coaster Conference, "CoasterMania", held at Cedar Point Amusement Park, Sandusky, Ohio, in 1978. On the subject of riding in the front vs riding in the back of a roller coaster, he said:

Truzzi died from cancer on February 2, 2003.

Pseudoskepticism 

Marcello Truzzi popularized the term pseudoskepticism in response to skeptics who, in his opinion, made negative claims without bearing the burden of proof of those claims.

While a Professor of Sociology at Eastern Michigan University in 1987, Truzzi discussed  pseudoskepticism in the journal Zetetic Scholar which he had founded:

In 1994 Susan Blackmore, a parapsychologist who became more skeptical and eventually became a CSICOP fellow in 1991, described what she termed the "worst kind of pseudoskepticism":

"Extraordinary claims"

Truzzi's remark is derived from the 18th century French mathematician Pierre-Simon de Laplace's "" (the more extraordinary a fact is, the more it needs to be supported by strong evidence). Carl Sagan later popularized Truzzi's adaptation of Laplace as "Extraordinary claims require extraordinary evidence", which came to be known as the Sagan standard.

Martin Gardner – Truzzi correspondence
In 2017, World Scientific released a book edited by Dana Richards about the correspondence between Martin Gardner and Truzzi. The book called Dear Martin, Dear Marcello: Gardner and Truzzi on Skepticism is broken up into four sections; "The Road to CSICOP", "The Demarcation Problem", "The Dissolution", and the "Return to Cordiality". The early letters from Truzzi were not preserved and the beginning of the book seems one-sided with only Gardner's letters. The editor, Richards states in the introduction the conflicts between the two men, their differing goals for CSICOP, and various people in the skeptic and paranormal communities. They discuss many topics including publishers, Geller, and the "definitions of charlatan and crankpot".

Books by Truzzi

 
 
 
 
 
 
 
 
 
 
 
 , 236 pages. Ten essays on methods of abductive inference in Poe's Dupin, Doyle's Holmes, Peirce and many others.

See also
 Encyclopedia of Pseudoscience (2002).
 Sextus Empiricus
 Charles Fort
 Thomas Kuhn
 Michael Polanyi
 Strong programme
 Science wars
 Modern flat Earth beliefs ("Zetetic astronomy")

References

Further reading
Obituaries
 Carroll, Robert Todd. "In Memoriam"
 Coleman, Loren. "Marcello Truzzi, 67, Always Curious, Dies". 2003.
 Kurtz, Paul. "Skeptical gadfly Marcello Truzzi – 1935–2003", Skeptical Inquirer, News and Comment – Obituary. May–June, 2003.
 Mathis, Jo Collins. "Expert on the Paranormal Dies: Longtime EMU Sociology Professor Marcello Truzzi Explored 'Things That Go Bump in the Night'". Ann Arbor News, February 9, 2003.
 Oliver, Myrna – "Professor Studied the Far-Out From Witchcraft to Psychic Powers". Los Angeles Times, February 11, 2003, Home Edition, p. B.11.
 Smith, Paul H. – "Marcello Truzzi: In Memoriam"
 "Marcello Truzzi, Sociologist was Student of Magic". Detroit News, February 12, 2003.

External links

Truzzi's writings
 Steveknightspost. "Emails from Marcello Truzzi".
 Truzzi, Marcello. "On Pseudo-Skepticism". The Anomalist, US, 2005.
 Truzzi, Marcello. "An End to the Uri Geller vs. Randi & CSICOP Litigations?". Psi Researcher No. 21. (originally in Parapsychological Association Newsletter)
 Truzzi, Marcello. "Reflection on the reception of unconventional claims of science". Frontier Perspectives, vol. 1 number 2, Fall/Winter 1990. (ed., copy located at: Marcello Truzzi on Zeteticism)
 Truzzi, Marcello, and Massimiliano Truzzi. "Notes toward a history of juggling". Bandwagon, Vol. 18 No. 2, March–April 1974.
 Truzzi, Marcello. "Massimiliano Truzzi's Act". Juggling Hall of Fame, July 1996.
 Truzzi, Marcello. "Project Alpha: Sabotage". Skeptical Inquirer, 8(2)187.

Other
 Clark, Jerome, "Archive > Milestones Marcello Truzzi (1935–2003)".  The Anomalist, US, 2005.
  Hansen, George P., "Marcello Truzzi (1935–2003)". (ed., recognizes Marcello Truzzi's contributions to sociology, the history of juggling, magic, and the study of the paranormal.)
 Zeteticism on the Flat Earth Wiki.

1935 births
2003 deaths
Danish emigrants to the United States
Deaths from cancer in Michigan
American sociologists
American people of Italian descent
Danish people of Italian descent
New College of Florida faculty
Eastern Michigan University faculty
American skeptics
Western esotericism scholars